Myung-hwan is a Korean masculine given name. Its meaning differs based on the hanja used to write each syllable of the name. There are 19 hanja with the reading "myung" and 21 hanja with the reading "hwan" on the South Korean government's official list of hanja which may be registered for use in given names.
 
People with this name include:
Yu Myung-hwan (born 1946), South Korean diplomat
Kim Myung-hwan (born 1987), South Korean football defender

See also
List of Korean given names

References

Korean masculine given names